The 1968 Pittsburgh Pirates season was the 87th season of the Pittsburgh Pirates franchise; the 82nd in the National League. The Pirates finished sixth in the league standings with a record of 80–82.

Offseason 
 October 3, 1967: Billy O'Dell was released by the Pirates.
 October 13, 1967: Larry Shepard named manager of the Pirates.
 November 28, 1967: Dennis Ribant was traded by the Pirates to the Detroit Tigers for Dave Wickersham.
 November 28, 1967: Chuck Hiller was selected by Pirates from Philadelphia Phillies in the Rule 5 major league draft.
 November 29, 1967: Bill Short was sold by Pirates to the New York Mets.
 December 2, 1967: Bob Oliver was traded by the Pirates to the Minnesota Twins for Ron Kline.
 December 3, 1967: Jim Pagliaroni was sold by the Pirates to the Oakland Athletics.
 December 15, 1967: Woodie Fryman, Bill Laxton, Don Money and Harold Clem (minors) were traded by the Pirates to the Philadelphia Phillies for Jim Bunning.
 January 8, 1968: Frank Taveras was signed by the Pirates as a non-drafted free agent.
 January 27, 1968: Tom Dettore was drafted by the Pirates in the 3rd round of the 1968 Major League Baseball Draft (Secondary Phase). Player signed March 29, 1968.

Regular season

Season standings

Record vs. opponents

Game log

|- bgcolor="ffbbbb"
| 1 || April 10 || @ Astros || 4–5 || Dierker || Pizarro (0–1) || — || 21,320 || 0–1
|- bgcolor="ccffcc"
| 2 || April 11 || @ Giants || 3–1 (15) || Face (1–0) || Linzy || Moose (1) || 7,844 || 1–1
|- bgcolor="ccffcc"
| 3 || April 13 || @ Giants || 2–1 || McBean (1–0) || Perry || — || 11,488 || 2–1
|- bgcolor="ccffcc"
| 4 || April 14 || @ Dodgers || 3–0 || Bunning (1–0) || Osteen || — || 27,136 || 3–1
|- bgcolor="ffbbbb"
| 5 || April 15 || @ Dodgers || 2–3 || Singer || Veale (0–1) || — || 16,214 || 3–2
|- bgcolor="ccffcc"
| 6 || April 17 || Astros || 13–4 || McBean (2–0) || Lemaster || — || 30,779 || 4–2
|- bgcolor="ffbbbb"
| 7 || April 19 || Giants || 2–5 || Marichal || Bunning (1–1) || — || 24,224 || 4–3
|- bgcolor="ffbbbb"
| 8 || April 20 || Giants || 0–1 || Sadecki || Veale (0–2) || — || 8,156 || 4–4
|- bgcolor="ccffcc"
| 9 || April 21 || Giants || 10–0 || McBean (3–0) || McCormick || — || 17,337 || 5–4
|- bgcolor="ffbbbb"
| 10 || April 22 || Dodgers || 3–5 || Brewer || Moose (0–1) || Billingham || 7,963 || 5–5
|- bgcolor="ccffcc"
| 11 || April 24 || Dodgers || 4–3 || Bunning (2–1) || Osteen || Face (1) || 4,938 || 6–5
|- bgcolor="ffbbbb"
| 12 || April 26 || @ Cardinals || 1–2 || Gibson || Veale (0–3) || — || 39,866 || 6–6
|- bgcolor="ffbbbb"
| 13 || April 27 || @ Cardinals || 5–7 || Briles || McBean (3–1) || Hoerner || 20,863 || 6–7
|- bgcolor="ffbbbb"
| 14 || April 28 || @ Cardinals || 2–4 || Carlton || Sisk (0–1) || — || 20,562 || 6–8
|- bgcolor="ccffcc"
| 15 || April 29 || Cubs || 7–4 || Blass (1–0) || Jenkins || Moose (2) || 5,603 || 7–8
|- bgcolor="ccffcc"
| 16 || April 30 || Cubs || 4–3 || Pizarro (1–1) || Hartenstein || — || 3,710 || 8–8
|-

|- bgcolor="ccffcc"
| 17 || May 1 || Cubs || 4–0 || McBean (4–1) || Nye || — || 5,449 || 9–8
|- bgcolor="ffbbbb"
| 18 || May 2 || Cubs || 0–1 || Niekro || Bunning (2–2) || — || 7,249 || 9–9
|- bgcolor="ffbbbb"
| 19 || May 3 || @ Phillies || 2–3 || Farrell || Kline (0–1) || — || 9,433 || 9–10
|- bgcolor="ffbbbb"
| 20 || May 4 || @ Phillies || 2–3 || Hall || Face (1–1) || — || 15,834 || 9–11
|- bgcolor="ccffcc"
| 21 || May 5 || @ Phillies || 5–2 || Wickersham (1–0) || Jackson || Moose (3) || 9,407 || 10–11
|- bgcolor="ccffcc"
| 22 || May 6 || @ Braves || 2–1 || Bunning (3–2) || Jarvis || Kline (1) || 9,131 || 11–11
|- bgcolor="ffbbbb"
| 23 || May 7 || @ Braves || 1–2 || Upshaw || McBean (4–2) || — || 6,610 || 11–12
|- bgcolor="ccffcc"
| 24 || May 8 || @ Braves || 4–3 (14) || Kline (1–1) || Upshaw || Face (2) || 7,035 || 12–12
|- bgcolor="ffbbbb"
| 25 || May 9 || @ Braves || 2–4 || Reed || Moose (0–2) || Britton || 5,704 || 12–13
|- bgcolor="ccffcc"
| 26 || May 10 || Phillies || 2–1 || Veale (1–3) || Fryman || Face (3) || 9,397 || 13–13
|- bgcolor="ccffcc"
| 27 || May 12 || Phillies || 2–1 || McBean (5–2) || James || — || 12,203 || 14–13
|- bgcolor="ffbbbb"
| 28 || May 13 || Cardinals || 0–1 || Briles || Bunning (3–3) || — || 10,082 || 14–14
|- bgcolor="ffbbbb"
| 29 || May 15 || Cardinals || 0–1 || Carlton || Blass (1–1) || — || 9,461 || 14–15
|- bgcolor="ccffcc"
| 30 || May 16 || Cardinals || 3–0 || Veale (2–3) || Washburn || — || 9,595 || 15–15
|- bgcolor="ffbbbb"
| 31 || May 17 || Reds || 2–3 || Maloney || McBean (5–3) || Abernathy || 13,499 || 15–16
|- bgcolor="ffbbbb"
| 32 || May 18 || Reds || 3–8 || McCool || Bunning (3–4) || — || 3,670 || 15–17
|- bgcolor="ffbbbb"
| 33 || May 19 || Reds || 3–9 || Culver || Blass (1–2) || Kelso || 9,458 || 15–18
|- bgcolor="ffbbbb"
| 34 || May 20 || @ Mets || 1–2 || Koosman || Veale (2–4) || — || 12,221 || 15–19
|- bgcolor="ffbbbb"
| 35 || May 21 || @ Mets || 3–4 (17) || Taylor || Moose (0–3) || — || 8,188 || 15–20
|- bgcolor="ccffcc"
| 36 || May 22 || @ Cubs || 13–6 || Sisk (1–1) || Niekro || Wickersham (1) || 5,075 || 16–20
|- bgcolor="ccffcc"
| 37 || May 24 || @ Reds || 8–5 || Kline (2–1) || Culver || — || 9,379 || 17–20
|- bgcolor="ccffcc"
| 38 || May 25 || @ Reds || 5–4 (12) || Sisk (2–1) || McCool || — || 12,153 || 18–20
|- bgcolor="ffffff"
| 39 || May 26 || @ Reds || 8–8 (7) ||  ||  || — || 9,672 || 18–20
|- bgcolor="ffbbbb"
| 40 || May 30 || Mets || 3–6 || Koosman || Bunning (3–5) || Koonce ||  || 18–21
|- bgcolor="ffbbbb"
| 41 || May 30 || Mets || 4–5 || Selma || Veale (2–5) || Jackson || 19,779 || 18–22
|- bgcolor="ffbbbb"
| 42 || May 31 || Braves || 2–5 || Niekro || McBean (5–4) || — || 7,301 || 18–23
|-

|- bgcolor="ccffcc"
| 43 || June 2 || Braves || 8–4 || Kline (3–1) || Cloninger || — ||  || 19–23
|- bgcolor="ffbbbb"
| 44 || June 2 || Braves || 5–10 || Jarvis || Moose (0–4) || Niekro || 21,491 || 19–24
|- bgcolor="ffbbbb"
| 45 || June 3 || @ Dodgers || 0–2 || Osteen || Veale (2–6) || — || 14,568 || 19–25
|- bgcolor="ffbbbb"
| 46 || June 4 || @ Dodgers || 0–5 || Drysdale || Bunning (3–6) || — || 30,422 || 19–26
|- bgcolor="ffbbbb"
| 47 || June 5 || @ Dodgers || 1–2 (10) || Singer || McBean (5–5) || — || 14,660 || 19–27
|- bgcolor="ffbbbb"
| 48 || June 6 || @ Dodgers || 2–4 || Sutton || Sisk (2–2) || — || 14,112 || 19–28
|- bgcolor="ccffcc"
| 49 || June 7 || @ Astros || 5–0 || Blass (2–2) || Giusti || — || 14,578 || 20–28
|- bgcolor="ffbbbb"
| 50 || June 8 || @ Astros || 2–3 || Lemaster || Bunning (3–7) || Buzhardt || 21,447 || 20–29
|- bgcolor="ccffcc"
| 51 || June 9 || @ Astros || 3–1 || Moose (1–4) || Cuellar || Kline (2) || 12,862 || 21–29
|- bgcolor="ffbbbb"
| 52 || June 10 || @ Giants || 0–8 || Marichal || Veale (2–7) || — || 4,356 || 21–30
|- bgcolor="ccffcc"
| 53 || June 11 || @ Giants || 7–4 || Kline (4–1) || Sadecki || Face (4) || 7,807 || 22–30
|- bgcolor="ffbbbb"
| 54 || June 12 || @ Giants || 2–4 || Bolin || Bunning (3–8) || Linzy || 4,771 || 22–31
|- bgcolor="ccffcc"
| 55 || June 13 || @ Giants || 8–7 || Sisk (3–2) || Linzy || Face (5) || 6,028 || 23–31
|- bgcolor="ccffcc"
| 56 || June 14 || Astros || 3–0 || Moose (2–4) || Lemaster || — || 8,603 || 24–31
|- bgcolor="ccffcc"
| 57 || June 15 || Astros || 13–2 || Veale (3–7) || Wilson || — || 5,005 || 25–31
|- bgcolor="ccffcc"
| 58 || June 16 || Astros || 3–1 || Blass (3–2) || Cuellar || Face (6) ||  || 26–31
|- bgcolor="ccffcc"
| 59 || June 16 || Astros || 11–2 || Sisk (4–2) || Dierker || Kline (3) || 8,448 || 27–31
|- bgcolor="ccffcc"
| 60 || June 17 || Astros || 4–3 || McBean (6–5) || Giusti || Face (7) || 5,887 || 28–31
|- bgcolor="ccffcc"
| 61 || June 18 || Dodgers || 3–2 (10) || Ellis (1–0) || Aguirre || — || 13,721 || 29–31
|- bgcolor="ccffcc"
| 62 || June 19 || Dodgers || 2–1 || Veale (4–7) || Singer || — || 10,799 || 30–31
|- bgcolor="ccffcc"
| 63 || June 20 || Dodgers || 7–3 || Blass (4–2) || Sutton || — ||  || 31–31
|- bgcolor="ffbbbb"
| 64 || June 20 || Dodgers || 2–3 (10) || Billingham || Face (1–2) || Purdin || 19,838 || 31–32
|- bgcolor="ffbbbb"
| 65 || June 21 || Giants || 0–3 || Bolin || McBean (6–6) || — || 16,222 || 31–33
|- bgcolor="ffbbbb"
| 66 || June 22 || Giants || 3–10 || McCormick || Moose (2–5) || — || 15,617 || 31–34
|- bgcolor="ffbbbb"
| 67 || June 23 || Giants || 1–2 || Marichal || Bunning (3–9) || — || 16,843 || 31–35
|- bgcolor="ccffcc"
| 68 || June 25 || @ Cardinals || 3–2 || Veale (5–7) || Carlton || Walker (1) || 26,927 || 32–35
|- bgcolor="ffbbbb"
| 69 || June 26 || @ Cardinals || 0–3 || Gibson || McBean (6–7) || — ||  || 32–36
|- bgcolor="ccffcc"
| 70 || June 26 || @ Cardinals || 3–1 || Blass (5–2) || Jaster || Kline (4) || 30,641 || 33–36
|- bgcolor="ccffcc"
| 71 || June 28 || @ Phillies || 10–1 || Bunning (4–9) || Fryman || — || 18,994 || 34–36
|- bgcolor="ccffcc"
| 72 || June 29 || @ Phillies || 1–0 || Moose (3–5) || Jackson || — || 17,052 || 35–36
|- bgcolor="ccffcc"
| 73 || June 30 || @ Phillies || 5–2 || Veale (6–7) || Farrell || — || 8,884 || 36–36
|-

|- bgcolor="ccffcc"
| 74 || July 2 || @ Mets || 2–1 || McBean (7–7) || Selma || Face (8) || 27,350 || 37–36
|- bgcolor="ccffcc"
| 75 || July 3 || @ Mets || 8–1 || Blass (6–2) || Ryan || — || 14,909 || 38–36
|- bgcolor="ccffcc"
| 76 || July 4 || @ Mets || 3–2 || Kline (5–1) || Koosman || — ||  || 39–36
|- bgcolor="ffbbbb"
| 77 || July 4 || @ Mets || 3–4 || Cardwell || Bunning (4–10) || Taylor || 29,587 || 39–37
|- bgcolor="ccffcc"
| 78 || July 5 || @ Cubs || 4–0 || Veale (7–7) || Nye || — || 16,040 || 40–37
|- bgcolor="ffbbbb"
| 79 || July 6 || @ Cubs || 1–6 || Jenkins || Walker (0–1) || — ||  || 40–38
|- bgcolor="ffbbbb"
| 80 || July 6 || @ Cubs || 2–10 || Ross || Sisk (4–3) || — || 30,794 || 40–39
|- bgcolor="ffbbbb"
| 81 || July 7 || @ Cubs || 4–5 || Regan || Veale (7–8) || — ||  || 40–40
|- bgcolor="ffbbbb"
| 82 || July 7 || @ Cubs || 3–4 || Regan || Face (1–3) || — || 32,447 || 40–41
|- bgcolor="ffbbbb"
| 83 || July 11 || Phillies || 0–5 || Jackson || Veale (7–9) || — ||  || 40–42
|- bgcolor="ffbbbb"
| 84 || July 11 || Phillies || 1–4 || Short || Moose (3–6) || Boozer || 15,371 || 40–43
|- bgcolor="ffbbbb"
| 85 || July 12 || Phillies || 2–3 || James || Bunning (4–11) || Boozer || 9,206 || 40–44
|- bgcolor="ffbbbb"
| 86 || July 13 || Phillies || 2–3 (16) || Short || Ellis (1–1) || — || 6,869 || 40–45
|- bgcolor="ffbbbb"
| 87 || July 14 || Cubs || 2–6 || Niekro || McBean (7–8) || — || 19,335 || 40–46
|- bgcolor="ffbbbb"
| 88 || July 15 || Cubs || 1–2 (10) || Jenkins || Walker (0–2) || — || 6,648 || 40–47
|- bgcolor="ccffcc"
| 89 || July 16 || Mets || 3–2 || Kline (6–1) || Selma || — || 6,123 || 41–47
|- bgcolor="ccffcc"
| 90 || July 17 || Mets || 8–2 || Blass (7–2) || Koosman || — ||  || 42–47
|- bgcolor="ffbbbb"
| 91 || July 17 || Mets || 4–5 || Koonce || Walker (0–3) || Taylor || 8,974 || 42–48
|- bgcolor="ffbbbb"
| 92 || July 18 || Mets || 0–3 || Seaver || McBean (7–9) || — || 6,234 || 42–49
|- bgcolor="ccffcc"
| 93 || July 19 || @ Braves || 2–0 || Moose (4–6) || Reed || — || 17,286 || 43–49
|- bgcolor="ccffcc"
| 94 || July 20 || @ Braves || 2–1 || Veale (8–9) || Niekro || — || 20,771 || 44–49
|- bgcolor="ccffcc"
| 95 || July 21 || @ Braves || 6–0 || Blass (8–2) || Pappas || — || 25,109 || 45–49
|- bgcolor="ffbbbb"
| 96 || July 23 || Reds || 6–7 (12) || Arrigo || Face (1–4) || Lee || 8,739 || 45–50
|- bgcolor="ffbbbb"
| 97 || July 25 || Reds || 0–2 || Culver || Veale (8–10) || Carroll || 5,797 || 45–51
|- bgcolor="ffbbbb"
| 98 || July 26 || Cardinals || 1–9 || Briles || Blass (8–3) || — ||  || 45–52
|- bgcolor="ccffcc"
| 99 || July 26 || Cardinals || 5–4 (10) || Kline (7–1) || Granger || — || 23,515 || 46–52
|- bgcolor="ffbbbb"
| 100 || July 27 || Cardinals || 0–4 || Carlton || Moose (4–7) || — || 12,147 || 46–53
|- bgcolor="ccffcc"
| 101 || July 28 || Cardinals || 7–1 || McBean (8–9) || Jaster || — || 14,926 || 47–53
|- bgcolor="ccffcc"
| 102 || July 29 || Braves || 3–2 || Veale (9–10) || Reed || — || 7,357 || 48–53
|- bgcolor="ccffcc"
| 103 || July 30 || Braves || 8–5 || Blass (9–3) || Johnson || Sisk (1) ||  || 49–53
|- bgcolor="ccffcc"
| 104 || July 30 || Braves || 5–4 (10) || Kline (8–1) || Niekro || — || 11,624 || 50–53
|- bgcolor="ffbbbb"
| 105 || July 31 || @ Reds || 2–8 || Arrigo || Moose (4–8) || — ||  || 50–54
|- bgcolor="ccffcc"
| 106 || July 31 || @ Reds || 10–1 || Ellis (2–1) || Ritchie || Face (9) || 14,780 || 51–54
|-

|- bgcolor="ccffcc"
| 107 || August 1 || @ Reds || 6–1 || Sisk (5–3) || Maloney || Face (10) || 10,926 || 52–54
|- bgcolor="ccffcc"
| 108 || August 2 || @ Giants || 3–1 || McBean (9–9) || Perry || — || 6,423 || 53–54
|- bgcolor="ffbbbb"
| 109 || August 3 || @ Giants || 0–7 || Sadecki || Veale (9–11) || — || 9,251 || 53–55
|- bgcolor="ffbbbb"
| 110 || August 4 || @ Giants || 0–2 || Bolin || Bunning (4–12) || — || 18,151 || 53–56
|- bgcolor="ffbbbb"
| 111 || August 5 || @ Dodgers || 0–1 (10) || Brewer || Blass (9–4) || — || 17,851 || 53–57
|- bgcolor="ccffcc"
| 112 || August 6 || @ Dodgers || 4–1 || Moose (5–8) || Drysdale || Kline (5) || 15,732 || 54–57
|- bgcolor="ffbbbb"
| 113 || August 7 || @ Dodgers || 2–6 || Sutton || McBean (9–10) || — || 13,848 || 54–58
|- bgcolor="ccffcc"
| 114 || August 8 || @ Astros || 4–3 || Kline (9–1) || Cuellar || Face (11) || 14,851 || 55–58
|- bgcolor="ffbbbb"
| 115 || August 9 || @ Astros || 1–2 || Shea || Ellis (2–2) || — || 15,270 || 55–59
|- bgcolor="ffbbbb"
| 116 || August 10 || @ Astros || 3–16 || Coombs || Blass (9–5) || — || 12,814 || 55–60
|- bgcolor="ccffcc"
| 117 || August 10 || @ Astros || 7–4 || Kline (10–1) || House || — || 25,814 || 56–60
|- bgcolor="ffbbbb"
| 118 || August 11 || @ Astros || 1–5 || Dierker || Sisk (5–4) || Giusti || 16,892 || 56–61
|- bgcolor="ffbbbb"
| 119 || August 13 || Giants || 0–3 || Marichal || Veale (9–12) || — || 9,135 || 56–62
|- bgcolor="ffbbbb"
| 120 || August 14 || Giants || 1–2 (10) || Perry || Kline (10–2) || — || 6,926 || 56–63
|- bgcolor="ccffcc"
| 121 || August 15 || Giants || 2–0 || Blass (10–5) || Bolin || — || 6,859 || 57–63
|- bgcolor="ffbbbb"
| 122 || August 16 || Dodgers || 4–8 || Drysdale || McBean (9–11) || Billingham || 8,221 || 57–64
|- bgcolor="ccffcc"
| 123 || August 17 || Dodgers || 3–0 || Moose (6–8) || Kekich || Kline (6) || 8,181 || 58–64
|- bgcolor="ccffcc"
| 124 || August 18 || Dodgers || 5–1 || Veale (10–12) || Sutton || — || 17,423 || 59–64
|- bgcolor="ffbbbb"
| 125 || August 19 || @ Reds || 3–8 || Arrigo || Bunning (4–13) || — || 6,659 || 59–65
|- bgcolor="ccffcc"
| 126 || August 20 || @ Reds || 8–3 || Ellis (3–2) || Ritchie || Kline (7) || 8,103 || 60–65
|- bgcolor="ccffcc"
| 127 || August 21 || @ Reds || 19–1 || Blass (11–5) || Maloney || Face (12) || 8,155 || 61–65
|- bgcolor="ffbbbb"
| 128 || August 22 || @ Reds || 5–7 || Abernathy || Sisk (5–5) || — || 7,195 || 61–66
|- bgcolor="ffbbbb"
| 129 || August 23 || @ Cardinals || 2–3 (11) || Hoerner || Kline (10–3) || — || 34,845 || 61–67
|- bgcolor="ccffcc"
| 130 || August 24 || @ Cardinals || 6–4 || Face (2–4) || Gibson || — || 31,019 || 62–67
|- bgcolor="ffbbbb"
| 131 || August 25 || @ Cardinals || 2–4 || Briles || Ellis (3–3) || Hoerner || 26,756 || 62–68
|- bgcolor="ccffcc"
| 132 || August 26 || @ Braves || 4–0 || Blass (12–5) || Pappas || — || 7,491 || 63–68
|- bgcolor="ccffcc"
| 133 || August 27 || @ Braves || 4–3 (11) || Kline (11–3) || Britton || Face (13) || 6,633 || 64–68
|- bgcolor="ffbbbb"
| 134 || August 28 || Cardinals || 0–8 || Gibson || Veale (10–13) || — || 11,197 || 64–69
|- bgcolor="ffbbbb"
| 135 || August 29 || Cardinals || 0–5 || Washburn || Moose (6–9) || — || 7,681 || 64–70
|- bgcolor="ffbbbb"
| 136 || August 30 || Braves || 0–2 || Pappas || Ellis (3–4) || Raymond || 5,896 || 64–71
|- bgcolor="ccffcc"
| 137 || August 31 || Braves || 8–0 || Blass (13–5) || Reed || — || 4,671 || 65–71
|-

|- bgcolor="ffbbbb"
| 138 || September 1 || Braves || 7–8 (11) || Raymond || Kline (11–4) || Britton || 5,650 || 65–72
|- bgcolor="ccffcc"
| 139 || September 2 || Astros || 6–1 || Veale (11–13) || Cuellar || — ||  || 66–72
|- bgcolor="ccffcc"
| 140 || September 2 || Astros || 4–3 (10) || Dal Canton (1–0) || Ray || — || 6,225 || 67–72
|- bgcolor="ccffcc"
| 141 || September 3 || Astros || 3–2 || Ellis (4–4) || Dierker || Walker (2) || 3,003 || 68–72
|- bgcolor="ccffcc"
| 142 || September 6 || Mets || 2–1 || Blass (14–5) || McAndrew || — || 4,082 || 69–72
|- bgcolor="ffbbbb"
| 143 || September 7 || Mets || 3–4 || Koosman || Bunning (4–14) || Taylor || 4,002 || 69–73
|- bgcolor="ccffcc"
| 144 || September 8 || Mets || 3–0 || Veale (12–13) || Seaver || — || 5,424 || 70–73
|- bgcolor="ffbbbb"
| 145 || September 9 || Phillies || 7–8 (15) || Short || Dal Canton (1–1) || — || 2,664 || 70–74
|- bgcolor="ffbbbb"
| 146 || September 11 || Phillies || 6–8 (12) || Wagner || McBean (9–12) || Farrell ||  || 70–75
|- bgcolor="ccffcc"
| 147 || September 11 || Phillies || 6–4 || Blass (15–5) || Wise || Walker (3) || 2,789 || 71–75
|- bgcolor="ffbbbb"
| 148 || September 13 || @ Mets || 0–2 || Koosman || Moose (6–10) || — || 17,245 || 71–76
|- bgcolor="ccffcc"
| 149 || September 14 || @ Mets || 6–0 || Veale (13–13) || Seaver || — || 15,676 || 72–76
|- bgcolor="ccffcc"
| 150 || September 15 || @ Mets || 3–0 || Blass (16–5) || Cardwell || — || 33,838 || 73–76
|- bgcolor="ccffcc"
| 151 || September 16 || @ Phillies || 6–1 || Ellis (5–4) || Wise || — || 2,087 || 74–76
|- bgcolor="ccffcc"
| 152 || September 17 || @ Phillies || 4–2 || Moose (7–10) || Short || Dal Canton (1) || 2,576 || 75–76
|- bgcolor="ffbbbb"
| 153 || September 18 || @ Phillies || 1–2 || Johnson || Veale (13–14) || Wagner || 2,463 || 75–77
|- bgcolor="ccffcc"
| 154 || September 20 || Cubs || 5–0 || Blass (17–5) || Jenkins || — || 4,478 || 76–77
|- bgcolor="ccffcc"
| 155 || September 21 || Cubs || 5–1 || Ellis (6–4) || Niekro || — || 3,429 || 77–77
|- bgcolor="ccffcc"
| 156 || September 22 || Cubs || 5–1 || Moose (8–10) || Holtzman || Dal Canton (2) || 27,405 || 78–77
|- bgcolor="ffbbbb"
| 157 || September 23 || Reds || 6–9 || Kelso || Kline (11–5) || Carroll ||  || 78–78
|- bgcolor="ccffcc"
| 158 || September 23 || Reds || 2–1 (10) || Kline (12–5) || Kelso || — || 4,232 || 79–78
|- bgcolor="ccffcc"
| 159 || September 24 || Reds || 2–0 || Blass (18–5) || Nolan || — || 4,044 || 80–78
|- bgcolor="ffbbbb"
| 160 || September 25 || Reds || 0–3 || Maloney || Ellis (6–5) || — || 4,577 || 80–79
|- bgcolor="ffbbbb"
| 161 || September 27 || @ Cubs || 1–4 || Holtzman || Moose (8–11) || Regan || 2,384 || 80–80
|- bgcolor="ffbbbb"
| 162 || September 28 || @ Cubs || 3–4 || Jenkins || Blass (18–6) || — || 10,940 || 80–81
|- bgcolor="ffbbbb"
| 163 || September 29 || @ Cubs || 4–5 || Regan || Moose (8–12) || — || 16,860 || 80–82
|-

|-
| Legend:       = Win       = Loss       = TieBold = Pirates team member

Opening Day lineup

Notable transactions 
 June 7, 1968: 1968 Major League Baseball draft
Milt May was drafted by the Pirates in the 11th round of the 1968 Major League draft.
Bruce Kison was drafted by the Pirates in the 14th round of the 1968 Major League draft.
 June 27, 1968: Juan Pizarro sold by the Pirates to the Boston Red Sox.
 July 15, 1968: Bill Virdon was signed as a free agent by the Pirates (Virdon, who was on the coaching staff, was activated as a player-coach while Freddie Patek was on the DL).
 August 13, 1968: Bill Virdon was released by the Pirates.
 August 19, 1968: Bill Henry was released by the Pirates.

Roster

Statistics
Batting
Note: G = Games played; AB = At bats; H = Hits; Avg. = Batting average; HR = Home runs; RBI = Runs batted in

Pitching
Note: G = Games pitched; IP = Innings pitched; W = Wins; L = Losses; ERA = Earned run average; SO = Strikeouts

Farm system

Notes

References 
 1968 Pittsburgh Pirates team page at Baseball Reference
 1968 Pittsburgh Pirates Page at Baseball Almanac

Pittsburgh Pirates seasons
Pittsburgh Pirates season
Pittsburg